Generation Warriors is a science fiction novel by American writers Anne McCaffrey and Elizabeth Moon. published by Baen Books in 1991. It concludes the Planet Pirates trilogy (1990–1991), which McCaffrey wrote alternately with Moon and Jody Lynn Nye, and it is the last book in the Ireta series that she initiated with Dinosaur Planet in 1978.

Summary

The title character from the first book of the trilogy - Sassinak - teams up with the main character from the second - her great-great-great grandmother Lunzie - to end the threat posed by planet pirates. An interesting plot point is that in terms of physical age and experience the granddaughter is over a decade older than her ancestor because the latter went through several lengthy periods of stasis (known as cold sleep) leading to questions of who is the "more experienced" elder.

References

External links 
 

1991 American novels
American science fiction novels
Novels by Anne McCaffrey
Novels by Elizabeth Moon
1991 science fiction novels